Mescalyne is the first EP by the black metal band Spektr. It was released in 2007 on Debemur Morti Productions.

Track listing
Hollow Contact - 6:43  
Mescalyne - 5:37  
Maze of Torment - 4:57  
Revelations - 5:41

External links
Metal Archives
[ Spektr] at Allmusic

2007 EPs
Spektr (band) albums